Brigitta Stockinger, FMedSci, FRS, is a molecular immunologist in the Francis Crick Institute in London. Stockinger's lab focus on understanding how certain immune cells, called T cells, develop and function as well as investigating how diet and other environmental factors can affect the way the immune system works.

Stockinger focuses on a particular type of immune cell that helps to control immune responses to viruses, bacteria and other pathogens, called a CD4 T cell.

Stockinger's research has provided insights into a particular type of CD4 T cell, called a Th17 cell, looking at why some of these cells become inflammatory and cause damage in the body. Her lab identified a particular receptor, the aryl hydrocarbon receptor (AhR), which connects environmental stimuli and the immune system.

Education
Stockinger was educated at the University of Mainz, where she was awarded a PhD in Biology. She then did postdoctoral studies in London, Cambridge and at the Cancer Research Institute in Heidelberg.

Career
 1985 - 1991 – Basel Institute for Immunology (Member)
 1991 - 2015 – Division of Molecular Immunology (now part of the Francis Crick Institute), MRC National Institute for Medical Research (Head)
 2015 - present – Principal Investigator in the Francis Crick Institute. Stockinger joined the Institute's scientific leadership team as an Associate Research Director in July 2020.

Awards and honours
Stockinger was elected a Fellow of the Royal Society in 2013. Her nomination reads: 

In 2008, she was elected a member of European Molecular Biology Organization (EMBO). She is also a fellow of the Academy of Medical Sciences.

References

Female Fellows of the Royal Society
Fellows of the Royal Society
Members of the European Molecular Biology Organization
Living people
Date of birth missing (living people)
Year of birth missing (living people)
Academics of the Francis Crick Institute